Gary Holton is an American linguist who works on Athabaskan languages of Alaska and Papuan languages of eastern Indonesia. He is also interested in the standards of archiving and sharing linguistic data.

He has bachelor's and master's degrees in mathematics. In 2000, he obtained a Ph.D. in linguistics at the University of California, Santa Barbara.

As of 2019, he is Professor at the University of Hawaii at Mānoa.

Publications
 Landscape in Western Pantar, a Papuan outlier of southern Indonesia (2011)
 Sketch of Western Pantar (Lamma) (2014)
 A unified system of spatial orientation in the Austronesian and non-Austronesian languages of Halmahera (2017)
 Interdisciplinary language documentation (2018)

References

Living people
Linguists of Papuan languages
Linguists of Timor–Alor–Pantar languages
Linguists of Na-Dene languages
Linguists from the United States
University of Hawaiʻi faculty
University of California, Santa Barbara alumni
Year of birth missing (living people)